Hazael Joseph Williams (April 28, 1830 – July 18, 1911) was an American politician who served in the Virginia House of Delegates.

References

External links 

1830 births
1911 deaths
Democratic Party members of the Virginia House of Delegates
19th-century American politicians